Alexandra Bøje (born 6 December 1999) is a Danish badminton player. She won her first senior international title at the 2016 Czech International in the mixed doubles event partnered with Mathias Bay-Smidt after fight through the qualification round, with the eight matches played. She was part of the national team that clinched the gold medals at the 2019 European Mixed Team and 2020 Women's Team Championships. She competed at the 2020 Summer Olympics.

Achievements

European Championships 
Mixed doubles

European Junior Championships 
Girls' doubles

BWF World Tour (2 titles, 2 runner-up) 
The BWF World Tour, which was announced on 19 March 2017 and implemented in 2018, is a series of elite badminton tournaments sanctioned by the Badminton World Federation (BWF). The BWF World Tour is divided into levels of World Tour Finals, Super 1000, Super 750, Super 500, Super 300 (part of the HSBC World Tour), and the BWF Tour Super 100.
Mixed doubles

BWF International Challenge/Series (5 titles, 9 runners-up) 
Women's doubles

Mixed doubles

  BWF International Challenge tournament
  BWF International Series tournament
  BWF Future Series tournament

References

External links 
 

1999 births
Living people
People from Horsens
Danish female badminton players
Badminton players at the 2020 Summer Olympics
Olympic badminton players of Denmark
Sportspeople from the Central Denmark Region
21st-century Danish women